Willow Park is a residential neighbourhood in the southeast quadrant of Calgary, Alberta. It is bounded to the west by Macleod Trail, to the south by Anderson Road, to the north by Southland Drive and to the east by the community of Maple Ridge. The Willow Park golf course bisects the neighbourhood from west to east, while Fairmont Drive crosses from south to north.  Southcentre Mall and Willow Park shopping village are located in the southwest corner of the neighbourhood.

It is represented in the Calgary City Council by the Ward 14 councillor.

Demographics

Residents in this community had a median household income of $63,588 in 2000, and there were 10.8% low income residents living in the neighbourhood. As of 2000, 15.4% of the residents were immigrants. A proportion of 9.5% of the buildings were condominiums or apartments, and 18.2% of the housing was used for renting.

Education
The community is served by Maple Ridge Elementary, Willow Park Middle School and R.T. Alderman Middle school public schools, as well as by St. William Elementary School (Catholic).

Fred Seymour Elementary School was closed in November 2006, but was later reopened as a French Immersion School.

Transit 

Willow Park is served by Calgary Transit Bus Route 99 and 10. The Anderson and Southland CTrain Stations serve Willow Park.

See also
List of neighbourhoods in Calgary

References

External links
Willow Park - Mapleridge Community Association

Neighbourhoods in Calgary